List of prominent alumni of South Dakota State University.

Academia, science, and technology
John Merton Aldrich (1888), zoologist, entomologist and curator of insects at the United States National Museum.
Stephen Foster Briggs (1907), inventor of the Briggs & Stratton engine
Theodore Schultz (1928), Economist, Nobel Laureate, 1979 Nobel Prize in Economics, and chair of Chicago School of Economics
Irwin Gunsalus, discovered lipoic acid, founder of United Nations International Center for Genetic Engineering and Biotechnology, and chair of National Academy of Sciences
Robert H. Burris (1936), National Academy of Sciences professor of Biochemistry at the University of Wisconsin–Madison
Cleveland L. Abbott Professor and coach of Tuskegee University and namesake of Tuskegee's Abbott Memorial Alumni Stadium
Gene Amdahl (1948), Architect of the IBM 360, IBM 704, IBM 709, and Amdahl's Law
John Mortvedt (1953), soils scientist
Vern L. Schramm (1963), Professor of Biochemistry at the Albert Einstein College of Medicine
Roger Zwieg (1964), NASA Astronaut and flight instructor

Arts and literature
Harvey Dunn (1902), American Painter
Jeanine Basinger (1958), Film historian
James Pollock (1965), American abstract and landscape artist
Kang-i Sun Chang (1972), Chair of the East Asian Languages and Literatures at Yale University.

Business
Nizar Al-Adsani (1983), CEO of Kuwait Petroleum Corporation.
Jerry Lohr, Founder and owner of J. Lohr Vineyards and Wines
Dana J. Dykhouse, President of First Premier Bank

Government and law

Philo Hall (1886), U.S. Representative from South Dakota and 6th Attorney General of South Dakota.
Sigurd Anderson, 19th Governor of South Dakota.
Ben Reifel (1932), U.S. Representative from South Dakota, first Indian member of Congress.
Francis G. Dunn (1935), Chief Justice, South Dakota Supreme Court.
Andrew Wendell Bogue (1941), Chief Judge, United States District Court for the District of South Dakota.
Gordon Mydland (1944), 23rd Attorney General of South Dakota. 
Richard F. Kneip (1945), 6th United States Ambassador to the Republic of Singapore and 25th Governor of South Dakota.
William Dougherty (1954), Lieutenant Governor of South Dakota.
Frank E. Denholm (1956), U.S. Representative from South Dakota.
Kermit A. Sande (1964), 24th Attorney General of South Dakota.
Tom Daschle (1969), United States Majority Leader of the United States Senate and U.S. Representative from South Dakota.
Larry Long (1969), 29th Attorney General of South Dakota.
Randy Seiler, 41st United States Attorney for the District of South Dakota.
Alan Lance (1971), 31st Attorney General of Idaho, Judge of the United States Court of Appeals for Veterans Claims, and National Commander of The American Legion.
David Gilbertson (1972), current Chief Justice, South Dakota Supreme Court.
Mike Rounds (1976), current U.S. Senator from South Dakota and 31st Governor of South Dakota.
Stephen Censky (1981), current United States Deputy Secretary of Agriculture.
Carole Hillard (1982), Lieutenant Governor of South Dakota.
Tom Nelson (1979), Mayor of the City of Lead and State Senator.
Kristie Fiegen (1984), Chairwoman of South Dakota Public Utilities Commission.
Gregory J. Stoltenburg (1984), current presiding judge, Third Circuit Court of South Dakota. 
Mark Salter (1990), current Associate Justice of the South Dakota Supreme Court. 
Jason Frerichs (2007), current South Dakota Senate Minority Leader. 
Kristi Noem (2011), current U.S. Representative from South Dakota and first female Governor of South Dakota.
Charles Abourezk, current Chief Justice, Rosebud Sioux Tribe Supreme Court.
Pam Cole, former member of the South Dakota State Senate.

Military
Willibald C. Bianchi (1939), World War II veteran and Medal of Honor recipient
William E. DePuy (1941), U.S. Army General and first commander of TRADOC
Leo K. Thorsness (1953), U.S. Air Force Colonel, Medal of Honor recipient, and Washington state senator 
Jake Krull (1960), U.S. General and South Dakota state senator 
Raymond W. Carpenter (1970), U.S. Major General of the United States Army, Director of the Army National Guard
Franklin J. Blaisdell (1971), U.S. Air Force General
Mark A. Clark (1980), U.S. Major General of United States Marine Corps
Gregory J. Stoltenburg (1984), U.S. Lieutenant Colonel

Sports
Paul Miller (1936), NFL halfback for the Green Bay Packers and 1x NFL Champion. 
Mark Barber (1937), NFL fullback for Cleveland Rams
Paul Ellering, Manager of the Road Warriors Hawk and Animal. Currently working in NXT managing The Authors of Pain
Jon Madsen, NCAA Wrestling National Champion, current mixed martial artist
Doug Eggers (1955), NFL linebacker for Baltimore Colts and Chicago Cardinals
Pete Retzlaff (1956), NFL player, 5x Pro-bowler and president of the NFL Players Association
Tom Black (1964), NBA center for Seattle SuperSonics
Wayne Rasmussen (1964), NFL safety for the Detroit Lions
Jim Langer (1970), NFL center, Pro Football Hall of Fame inductee, and 2x Super Bowl Champion
Lynn Boden (1975), NFL guard for Detroit Lions and Chicago Bears
Brad Seely (1978), current NFL special teams coach of the Oakland Raiders
Steve Lingenfelter (1981), NBA forward for Washington Bullets and San Antonio Spurs
Rod DeHaven (1991), 2000 Olympic Marathoner and 2000 U.S. Olympic Trials Champion
Doug Miller (1993), NFL linebacker for San Diego Chargers
Adam Vinatieri (1996), NFL kicker and 4x Super Bowl Champion
Adam Timmerman (1995), NFL guard for Green Bay Packers and St. Louis Rams, 2x Pro-Bowler, and 2x Super Bowl Champion
Steve Heiden (1999), NFL tight end for the Cleveland Browns, San Diego Chargers, and current NFL special teams coach of the Arizona Cardinals
Josh Ranek (2002), CFL running back for the Edmonton Eskimos, Hamilton Tiger-Cats, and Ottawa Renegades
Parker Douglass (2009), NFL placekicker for Cleveland Browns and New York Jets
JaRon Harris (2009), NFL wide receiver for Green Bay Packers
Danny Batten (2010), NFL defensive end for Buffalo Bills
Colin Cochart (2011), NFL tight end for Cincinnati Bengals and Dallas Cowboys
Dale Moss (2012), NFL wide receiver for the Green Bay Packers
 David Michaud, professional Mixed Martial Artist
Nate Wolters (2013), NBA guard for Utah Jazz
Zach Zenner (2014), NFL running back for Detroit Lions
Dallas Goedert (2018), NFL tight end for Philadelphia Eagles
Jake Wieneke (2018), NFL wide receiver for Minnesota Vikings
Bryan Witzmann (2014), NFL offensive lineman for Kansas City Chiefs

References

External links

South Dakota State Athletics website

South Dakota State University people